The Oxford Placement Test (OPT), also called the Oxford Online Placement Test (OOPT), is an on demand computer-adaptive test of the English language for non-native speakers of English, reporting at Pre-A1, A1, A2, B1, B2, C1, and C2 levels of the Common European Framework of Reference (CEFR). The test was developed by Oxford University Press (OUP) to provide institutions with a quick, reliable way to place English language students into the correct level English class. Placement testing is a key stage in the learning cycle.

History
The Oxford Placement Test, the first globally available online computer-adaptive placement test, was launched in 2009 and has placed millions of test takers since it was launched. It tests British English, American English, or a mix of the two language variants. The OPT replaced the now retired Quick Placement Test, a CD-ROM test provided in partnership with Cambridge English. The success of the Oxford Placement Test led to the design of the Oxford Test of English, and online computer-adaptive English Proficiency test, used as proof of English ability for university entry and employment.

Test specifications
The Oxford Placement Test is designed to provide a quick, accurate measurement of a test taker's English language ability on the CEFR scale. The test consists of two sections: Language Use and Listening. Within the Use of English Section, in addition to standard grammar, lexis and listening questions, the test design focuses on meaning beyond the sentence, including implied meaning; the language sampled in the test is an accurate predictor of general language ability. The test has been independently reviewed and found perform better than other placement tests.

Computer adaptive
The Oxford Placement Test uses computer-adaptive testing (CAT) technology. Computer adaptive tests can be more efficient and provide more precise measurement than traditional tests. The adaptive test works by selecting each successive question from a large bank of questions, based on the test taker's response to the previous question. This makes for a better test experience for test takers than traditional language tests. 

The OPT's online Learning Management System (LMS) allows institutions to administer the test at physical institutions, or for the test to be taken at the test taker's home.

Results
Results are available immediately and are reported as a CEFR band (Pre-A1 to C2) and as a standardized score (0-120) on the OPT scale. Report cards provide a breakdown by section, including the time taken to complete each section. Report cards can carry the institution's branding. The CEFR levels and standardized scores are shown in this table:

References 

Standardized tests for English language
Test